Azeez O. Ojulari (born June 16, 2000) is an American football outside linebacker for the New York Giants of the National Football League (NFL). He played college football at Georgia and was drafted by the Giants in the second round of the 2021 NFL Draft.

Early years
Ojulari was born on June 16, 2000, in Austell, Georgia, and attended Marietta High School in Marietta, Georgia. As a senior, he had 118 tackles and 11 sacks before suffering a torn ACL. He was selected to the 2018 U.S. Army All-American Bowl. He committed to the University of Georgia to play college football.

College career
After recovering from the torn ACL he suffered his senior season of high school, Ojulari played in two games his first year at Georgia in 2018 and took a redshirt. As a redshirt freshman in 2019, he played in all 14 games and made 13 starts. He recorded 36 tackles and 5.5 sacks. Ojulari returned to Georgia in 2020 as a starter. During the 2020 season Ojulari was named second-team All-SEC and was the defensive MVP of the 2021 Peach Bowl.

Professional career

New York Giants
Ojulari was selected by the New York Giants in the second round (50th overall) of the 2021 NFL Draft. He signed his four-year rookie contract on May 13, 2021. Ojulari finished the season with 8 sacks which set an all-time New York Giants record for sacks by a rookie, surpassing B. J. Hill, who recorded 5.5 sacks in 2018.

On October 22, 2022, Ojulari was placed on injured reserve. On December 3, he was activated from injured reserve.

Personal life
Ojulari was born the son of Nigerian immigrants; his maternal grandfather was the late Yoruban artist and musician Twins Seven Seven. His younger brother, BJ Ojulari, played college football at LSU.

References

External links
New York Giants bio
Georgia Bulldogs bio

2000 births
Living people
American sportspeople of Nigerian descent
Players of American football from Atlanta
American football outside linebackers
American football defensive ends
Georgia Bulldogs football players
New York Giants players
American people of Yoruba descent
Yoruba sportspeople